The Handel Prize is an annual award, instituted in 1956, which is presented by the city of Halle, in Germany, in honour of the celebrated Baroque composer George Frideric Handel. It is awarded, "for exceptional artistic, academic or politico-cultural services as far as these are connected with the city of Halle's Handel commemoration". The prize consists of a diploma, a gold and enamel badge, (and until 2008 10,000 euros in prize money) and is presented during the annual Handel Festival, Halle.

List of recipients
Source Freundes- und Förderkreis des Händel-Hauses zu Halle e.V:

References

External links
Handel Prize Winner
Current Handel Prize Winner

German music awards
George Frideric Handel
Classical music awards
Awards established in 1956
1956 establishments in East Germany